Stanley Melvin Friedman (born March 18, 1936) is a former head of the Bronx County Democratic Committee (better known as the Bronx Democratic party), a former Deputy Mayor of New York City, and later hotelier.

Early life 
Friedman was born in the Bronx on March 18, 1936, and grew up in the Hunts Point district. He graduated from Stuyvesant High School in 1953, the City College of New York in 1958 and Brooklyn Law School in 1961.

Political career 
Friedman worked as a lawyer first for the Federal Trade Commission and then as an assistant district attorney for the Bronx. He was an associate counsel to the New York City Council's Thomas J. Cuite when he became the Deputy Mayor of New York City for Intergovernmental Affairs on January 2, 1975, under Mayor Abraham Beame. Friedman served until the end of Beame's term in December 1977, when Beame gave Friedman a lifetime appointment to the Board of Water Supply, a part-time job that came with a salary of $25,000 (equal to $107,509 in 2021 dollars), a limousine, and a secretary. 

Mayor Ed Koch pressed Friedman to resign the position in May 1978, as Friedman received Koch's support to take control of the Democratic party in the Bronx; Koch denied a connection between the resignation and his endorsement.

In 1978 Friedman became the leader of the Bronx chapter of the New York State Democratic party ("Chairman of the Executive Committee of the Bronx County Democratic Committee").  He was succeeded in 1987 by New York State Assemblyman George Friedman (no relation to Stanley M. Friedman). Also, in 1978, he became a law partner to Roy Cohn.

He was indicted on civil charges involving the New York City Parking Violations Bureau on March 27, 1986. He was defended in that case by Thomas P. Puccio. Friedman was later convicted on federal corruption charges in that case, which was presided over by Whitman Knapp and prosecuted by Rudy Giuliani. He was removed as the Bronx Democratic party leader when he was sentenced to a 12 year prison term on March 12, 1987, the same day that his mentoree, Stanley Simon resigned as Bronx Borough President on unrelated charges. He served four years before his release in 1992.

Post political career 
After completing his prison sentence, and being barred for life from participating in politics, Friedman became a hotelier. He managed facilities in Staten Island, where he sat on the Staten Island Chamber of Commerce executive board, and later in Florida.

References 

1936 births
Living people
New York (state) Democrats
Politicians from the Bronx
City College of New York alumni
Deputy mayors of New York City
Stuyvesant High School alumni
Brooklyn Law School alumni